Anton Vladimirovich Grigoryev (born 13 December 1985) is a Russian football central defender.

Club career
Grigoryev made one appearance in UEFA Champions League 2006-07 for CSKA coming as a substitute vs Hamburg.
On 17 February 2014 he signed for FC Tosno.

In January 2015, Grigoryev went on trial with FC Sakhalin Yuzhno-Sakhalinsk, before signing for FC Atyrau of the Kazakhstan Premier League.

In June 2016, after six-months without a club, Grigoryev signed for FC Taraz.

Career honours
 Russian Cup: 2008, 2009

References

External links
 

1985 births
Footballers from Moscow
Living people
Russian footballers
Russia under-21 international footballers
Association football central defenders
Russian Premier League players
Kazakhstan Premier League players
PFC CSKA Moscow players
FC Kuban Krasnodar players
FC Spartak Vladikavkaz players
FC Tosno players
FC Veris Chișinău players
FC Atyrau players
FC Taraz players
Russian expatriate footballers
Expatriate footballers in Moldova
Expatriate footballers in Kazakhstan
FC Volgar Astrakhan players